Lotbinière is a former provincial electoral district in the Centre-du-Québec and Chaudière-Appalaches regions of Quebec, Canada. As of its final election, it included the municipalities of Lotbinière, Saint-Flavien, Lemieux, Laurierville, Saint-Antoine-de-Tilly, Sainte-Croix and Laurier-Station.

It was created for the 1867 election (and an electoral district of that name existed earlier in the Legislative Assembly of the Province of Canada and the Legislative Assembly of Lower Canada).  Its final election was in 2008.  It disappeared in the 2012 election and the successor electoral districts were Lotbinière-Frontenac, Nicolet-Bécancour, and Arthabaska.

Members of the Legislative Assembly / National Assembly
 Henri-Gustave Joly de Lotbinière, Liberal (1867–1885)
 Édouard-Hippolyte Laliberté, Liberal (1886–1900)
 Napoleon Lemay, Conservative – Liberal (1900–1908)
 Joseph-Napoléon Francoeur, Liberal (1908–1936)
 Maurice Pelletier, Union Nationale (1936–1939)
 René Chaloult, Liberal (1939–1944)
 Guy Roberge, Liberal (1944–1948)
 René Bernatchez, Union Nationale (1948–1970)
 Jean-Louis Béland, Ralliement creditiste (1970–1973)
 Georges-J.-P. Massicotte, Liberal (1973–1976)
 Rodrigue Biron, Union Nationale (1976–1980), Parti Québécois (1980–1985)
 Lewis Camden, Liberal (1985–1994)
 Jean-Guy Paré, Parti Québécois (1994–2003)
 Sylvie Roy, Action démocratique (2003–2012), CAQ (2012)

Election results

|-
 
|Liberal
|Julie Champagne
|align="right"|7,577
|align="right"|34.50
|align="right"|+12.61

|}

|-
 
|Liberal
|Laurent Boissonneault
|align="right"|5,720  
|align="right"|21.89
|align="right"|-12.61

|}
* Increase is from UFP

|-
 
|Liberal
|Lewis Camden
|align="right"|13,335
|align="right"|59.85
|align="right"|+6.33

|-
 
|New Democrat
|Allen Guilbert
|align="right"|616
|align="right"|2.76
|align="right"|-
|-

|}

|-
 
|Liberal
|Lewis Camden
|align="right"|12,382
|align="right"|53.52
|align="right"|+10.32

|-

|Christian Socialist
|Guy Martin
|align="right"|317
|align="right"|1.37
|align="right"|-
|}

|-
 
|Liberal
|Jean Tremblay 
|align="right"|10,288
|align="right"|43.20
|align="right"|+19.35
|-

|}

|-

|-
 
|Liberal
|Georges-J.-P. Massicotte
|align="right"|5,642
|align="right"|23.85
|align="right"|-24.26

|-

|}

|-
 
|Liberal
|Georges-J.-P. Massicotte
|align="right"|9,907
|align="right"|48.11
|align="right"|+15.02
|-

|Parti créditiste
|Jean-Louis Béland
|align="right"|6,163
|align="right"|29.93
|align="right"|-5.91

|-

|}

References

External links
Information
 Elections Quebec

Election results
 Election results (National Assembly)
 Election results (Elections Quebec)

Maps
 2001 map (Flash)
2001–2011 changes (Flash)
1992–2001 changes (Flash)
 Electoral map of Centre-du-Québec region (as of 2001)
 Electoral map of Chaudières-Appalaches region (as of 2001)
 Quebec electoral map, 2001

Former provincial electoral districts of Quebec